Woori the Virgin is a 2022 South Korean television series written and directed by Jeong Jeong-hwa, and starring Im Soo-hyang in the lead role as Oh Woo-ri, with Sung-hoon, Shin Dong-wook and Hong Ji-yoon. Based on the American series Jane the Virgin, it premiered on SBS TV on May 9, 2022, and aired every Monday and Tuesday at 22:00 (KST) for 14 episodes.

Synopsis
The series is a romantic comedy drama about Oh Woo-ri (Im Soo-hyang), a woman who kept her virginal purity, getting pregnant with a child of Raphael (Sung Hoon), the CEO of a cosmetic group, due to the doctor's mistake during a regular check-up.

Cast and characters

Main
 Im Soo-hyang as Oh Woo-ri
29 years old, an assistant writer of a popular drama airing in that time.
 Sung Hoon as Raphael
33 years old, CEO of Diamond Cosmetics and the biological father of the child.
 Shin Dong-wook as Lee Kang-jae
33 years old, Woo-ri's boyfriend, a homicide detective.

Supporting

Seogwi-nyeo Tonkatsu
 Hong Eun-hee as Oh Eun-ran
 Ko Joo-hee as young Oh Eun-ran
45 years old, Woo-ri's mother, singing class instructor.
 Yeon Woon-kyung as Seo Gwi-nyeo
66 years old. Owner of the tonkatsu shop.

Diamond Medical Foundation
 Joo Jin-mo as Kim Deok-bae
61 years old. Chairman of the Diamond Medical Foundation.
 Hong Ji-yoon as Lee Ma-ri/Lee Mal-ja
29 years old, Raphael's wife, Diamond Medical Foundation marketing team leader.
 Park Seon-young as Director Lim
36 years old, chief secretary.
 Nam Mi-jung as Byun Mi-ja 
 52 years old, trickster

Police office
 Han Jae-yi as Park Na-hee 
29 years old, violent crimes detective.
 Kim Dong-hyun as class leader 
47 years old, strong squad leader.

Broadcast stations 
 Kim Soo-ro as Choi Seong-il
45 years old, broadcast age 39 years old, Eun-ran's first love, becomes a daily soap opera star after a long period of no fame. His real name is Choi Deok-chil.
 Lee Do-yeon as Yu Ye-ri 
35 years old, drama writer.
 Im Jae-myung as director Park 
37 years old, drama director.
 Yeon Min-ji as Choi Mi-ae
 31 years old, actress.

Others
 Kim Sa-kwon as Park Doo-pal
 Kim Sun-woong as Noh Man-cheol
 Ahn Shin-woo as Jung Hyung-sik, the head of a security company.

Special appearance 
 Hwang Woo-seul-hye as obstetrician-gynecologist

Production
The series a remake of American TV series Jane the Virgin which aired for five seasons on The CW television network in the United States from 2014 to 2019. The American series is itself based on the 2002 Venezuelan telenovela, Juana La Virgen.

Woori the Virgin reunites Im Soo-hyang and Sung Hoon after 2011 SBS drama New Tales of Gisaeng which was the debut drama of both of them, and 2016 KBS 2TV drama Five Enough.

On April 15, 2022, photos of the script reading were released.

Original soundtrack

Part 1

Part 2

Part 3

Part 4

Part 5

Part 6

Part 7

Viewership

Awards and nominations

Notes

References

External links
  
 
 Woori the Virgin at Naver 
 Woori the Virgin at Daum 
 
 

Seoul Broadcasting System television dramas
Korean-language television shows
Television series by Studio S
2022 South Korean television series debuts
2022 South Korean television series endings
Pregnancy-themed television shows
South Korean television series based on non-South Korean television series
South Korean romantic comedy television series
Television series about families
South Korean television series based on American television series